Harold Martin may refer to:

 Harold Martin (footballer) (born 1950), VFL player and VFA coach
 Harold Martin (New Jersey politician) (1918–2010), Member of the New Jersey General Assembly
 Harold Martin (New Caledonian politician) (born 1954), politician of New Caledonia
 Harold Martin (dragster driver), American drag racer
 Harold Brownlow Martin (1918–1988), Australian Royal Air Force pilot during World War II
 Harold E. Martin (1923–2007), newspaper editor and publisher
 Harold L. Martin (born 1951), American engineer and educator
 Harold T. Martin III (born 1964), former NSA contractor convicted of theft of classified information
 Harold Martin Jr., CEO of the Taco Mac chain of restaurants
 Harold D. Martin (1899–1945), American football player and coach
Harold Martin, alias of Person of Interest character Harold Finch

See also
Harry Martin (disambiguation)